Sitdown, Sit Down or sit-down may refer to the following:

 Sit-down hydrofoil, a water sport in which one rides above the water, supported by a hydrofoil wing 
 Sitdown strike, a strike in which workers take possession of a workplace by "sitting down"
 Sit-down restaurant, a type of restaurant
 Sitdown, a type of powerbomb, a professional wrestling throw
 A meeting, terminology frequently used in mafia media, such as The Godfather franchise
 In British Methodism, "to sit down" is a technical phrase referring to Ministers ceasing active stipendiary work to become "supernumerary" ministers

Music
 Sit Down (EP), a 1997 EP by Run On
 "Sit Down" (song), a 1989 song by James

See also
 Sit-in, a form of direct action that involves one or more people nonviolently occupying an area for a protest